Garib Rath service was introduced in 2005 by former Indian railway minister Lalu Prasad Yadav. It is an air conditioned Express train that  can run at the same speed as Rajadhani Express or Shatabdi Express. The specialty of the service is the ticket fare is inexpensive compared to the other luxury trains and it is faster than other express trains.

Kochuveli is a satellite terminal station in Thiruvananthapuram, capital city of Kerala and Yeshvantpur is a satellite terminal located in an industrial-cum-residential area in the north western part of Bangalore City, capital of Karnataka. Train Number 12257 runs between Yesvantpur and Kochuveli on Sunday, Tuesday and Thursday and Train Number 12258 runs between Kochuveli and Yesvantpur on Monday, Wednesday and Friday. It is operated by the South Western Railway Zone.

About Garib Rath Express

The Garib Rath (literally: "Poor Man's Chariot") is a no-frills air-conditioned train started by the Indian Railways in 2005 to provide cheaper air-conditioned travel to passengers who cannot afford normal fares of air conditioned class in normal trains. As the fares are less than two-thirds of the fares for air conditioned classes in other trains, the distance between each seat or berth is less, the seats and berths are narrower and each coach has more seats and berths than in air-conditioned coaches in other trains. Only seating and three-tier (78 seats) accommodation is provided in Garib Rath. The passengers are not provided free bedding or food. The maximum speed of Garib Rath trains is around 130 kmph, nearly same as Rajdhani's top speed . It runs on single line from Baiyappanahalli(Bangalore) to Salem, and double line from Salem to Trivandrum.

Engine used

Due to partial electrification enroute, upon introduction until January 2023, the 12257 / 58 Yesvantpur–Kochuveli-Yesvantpur Garib Rath Express was hauled by a Krishnarajapuram-based WDP-4/WDP-4D from Yesvantpur Junction upto it's destination Kochuveli end to end.Since the route is completely electrified now it is hauled by a Krishnarajapuram shed WAP-7(KJM WAP-7)

Coaches

The Kochuveli Yesvantpur Garib Rath Express has 16 AC 3 tier coaches. It does not have AC Chair Car coaches like some Garib Rath trains. The number of coaches is added / removed as per the demand on the train. There is no pantry car but catering is arranged on board the train.

Coach position
Coach position for 12257 Yesvantpur - Kochuveli Garib Rath Express 

Coach position for 12258 Kochuveli - Yesvantpur Garib Rath Express

Schedule

12257 Yesvantpur Kochuveli Garib Rath Express leaves Yesvantpur Jn on Sunday, Tuesday & Thursday at 21:00 Hrs IST  and reaches at 13:15 Hrs Kochuveli next day.

On return, the 12258 Kochuveli Yesvantpur Garib Rath Express leaves Kochuveli on Monday, Wednesday, Friday at 17:00 Hrs and reaches Yesvantpur Junction next day at 9:30 Hrs IST.

Train Schedules

See also

 Bangalore City - Kochuveli Express
 Kochuveli-SMVT Bengaluru Humsafar Express
 Yesvantpur–Kochuveli AC Express

References

Garib Rath Express trains
Rail transport in Kerala
Railway services introduced in 2005
Transport in Thiruvananthapuram
Transport in Bangalore
Rail transport in Karnataka
Rail transport in Tamil Nadu